The Carolinas Geographical Union is the Geographical Union (GU) for rugby union teams playing in North Carolina and South Carolina for USA Rugby.

North Carolina LAU
The North Carolina Rugby Union is the Local Area Union (LAU) for rugby union teams playing in North Carolina.

Men's Senior Clubs
 Charlotte Rugby Football Club CRFC Men's Team
 Tobacco Road Rugby Club
Bragg Rugby Football Club (based in Fayetteville, North Carolina) – NCRU Division II
Cherry Point Rugby Football Club
LeJeune Rugby Football Club
 Triad Rugby Football Club
 Cape Fear Rugby Football Club
 Duke Grads Rugby Football Club
 Gaston County Rugby Football Club
 Eno River Rage Rugby Football Club (based in Durham, North Carolina) – NCRU Division III
 Southern Pines Rugby Football Club – NCRU Division III
 Charlotte Barbarians Rugby Football Club  – NCRU Division III
 Charlotte Royals Rugby Football Club
 Wilmington Rugby Football Club "Liberty Ships"
 Asheville Rugby Football Club

Women's Senior Clubs
 Asheville Women's Rugby Football Club
 Augusta Furies
 Charleston Hurricanes/Savannah Shamrocks
 Charlotte Rugby Football Club CRFC Women's Team
 Columbia Bombshells
 Eno River Rugby Women's Rugby Football Club
 Ft. Bragg Women's Rugby Football Club

Men's Collegiate
 AHO (Appalachian State) RFC
 Belmont Abbey College
 Davidson
 Duke
 East Carolina
 Elon
 Guilford College
 North Carolina State
 UNC – Chapel Hill
 UNC – Charlotte
 UNC – Greensboro
 UNC – Pembroke
 UNC – Wilmington
 Wake Forest
 Western Carolina
 Wingate University

Women's Collegiate
 Appalachian State
 Duke
 East Carolina
 Elon
 Guilford
 North Carolina State
 UNC – Greensboro
 UNC – Chapel Hill
 UNC – Charlotte
 UNC – Wilmington
 Western Carolina

High School Varsity
 Charlotte Catholic High School RFC 
 Concord High School RFC
 East Mecklenburg High School RFC
 Myers Park High School RFC
 North Mecklenburg High School RFC
 Northwest Guilford High School RFC
 Providence High School RFC
 West Mecklenburg High School RFC
 Hoke County High School RFC
 Ardrey Kell High School RFC
 William A. Hough High School RFC

High School Club U19
 Chapel Hill Highlanders RFC
 Raleigh Rattlesnakes RFC
 South Charlotte Tigers RFC 
 Triad Bulldogs RFC
 Union County Lions RFC
 Southern Pines/Pinehurst Gators RFC

Women's U19
 East Meck
 North Meck
 Myers Park
 Providence
 Hough
 South Meck

South Carolina LAU
The South Carolina Rugby Union is the Local Area Union (LAU) for rugby union teams playing in South Carolina.

Men's Senior Clubs
 Charleston Outlaws RFC
 Columbia Olde Grey

Women's Senior Clubs
 Columbia Bombshells Rugby Football Club

Men's Collegiate
 Clemson Rugby
 USC – Columbia RFC

See also
Rugby union in the United States

References

External links
USA Rugby official site
IRB Official Site

Rugby union governing bodies in the United States
Rugby union in North Carolina
2013 establishments in North Carolina
2013 establishments in South Carolina
Sports organizations established in 2013